Thibo Baeten (born 4 June 2002) is a Belgian professional footballer who plays as a forward for Beerschot on loan from the Dutch club NEC.

Club career
Baeten began his career at the youth academy of Club Brugge. On 22 August 2020, Baeten made his debut for Brugge's reserve side, Club NXT in the Belgian First Division B against RWDM47. He came on as a 79th minute substitute as NXT lost 0–2.

Baeten scored his first professional goal on 13 September 2020 against Union Saint-Gilloise. His 1st minute goal gave NXT the lead but the match soon ended 1–1.

In the winter of 2021, Baeten expressed his wish to leave Club Brugge, where he had an expiring contract. That winter, Baeten could count on interest from Cercle Brugge and from Italy. On 22 January 2021, he signed a contract with Dutch Eerste Divisie club NEC until mid-2024. On 5 March 2021, Baeten scored his first goal for NEC in the 7–0 win over Helmond Sport.

On 23 May 2021, Baeten won promotion to the Eredivisie with NEC by beating NAC Breda 2–1 in the final of the play-offs. Unlike his compatriots Jonathan Okita and Mathias De Wolf, Baeten did not appear in any of the three promotion matches.

On 3 August 2021, he joined Serie A side Torino on loan with an option to buy. He would join the club's under-19 team.

On 10 April 2022, Baeten agreen to join Beerschot on loan for the 2022–23 season, with an option to buy.

Career statistics

Club

References

External links
Profile at the UEFA website

2002 births
Living people
Belgian footballers
Belgium youth international footballers
Association football midfielders
Club NXT players
NEC Nijmegen players
Torino F.C. players
Challenger Pro League players
Eerste Divisie players
Belgian expatriate footballers
Expatriate footballers in the Netherlands
Belgian expatriate sportspeople in the Netherlands
Expatriate footballers in Italy
Belgian expatriate sportspeople in Italy